Gitane–Frigécrème was a French professional cycling team that existed from 1972 to 1973. At the end of the 1973 season, the team was merged into the Sonolor team, which was renamed Sonolor–Gitane for 1974. Its main sponsor was French bicycle manufacturer Gitane.

References

External links

Cycling teams based in France
Defunct cycling teams based in France
1972 establishments in France
1973 disestablishments in France
Cycling teams established in 1972
Cycling teams disestablished in 1972